1384 Kniertje, provisional designation , is a dark Adeonian asteroid from the central regions of the asteroid belt, approximately 26 kilometers in diameter. It was discovered on 9 September 1934, by Dutch astronomer Hendrik van Gent at the Union Observatory in Johannesburg, South Africa. The asteroid was named after a character in the Dutch play Op Hoop van Zegen by Herman Heijermans.

Orbit and classification 

Kniertje is a member of the Adeona family, a large family of carbonaceous asteroids in the central main belt, named after 145 Adeona. It is also dynamically classified as a member of the Eunomia family, the largest in the intermediate main belt with more than 5,000 stony asteroids.

The asteroid orbits the Sun in the central asteroid belt at a distance of 2.2–3.2 AU once every 4 years and 5 months (1,599 days). Its orbit has an eccentricity of 0.18 and an inclination of 12° with respect to the ecliptic. The body's observation arc begins with its official discovery observation at Johannesburg in 1934.

Physical characteristics 

Kniertjes spectral type is unknown. Although the LCDB assumes an S-type (due to its dynamical classification to the stony Eunomia family), a low albedo of 0.0701 is derived (see below) which is typical for carbonaceous C-type asteroids and in agreement with the overall spectral type of the Adeona family.

Rotation period 

Several rotational lightcurves of Kniertje have been obtained from photometric observations since 2003. Lightcurve analysis gave a rotation period between 9.78 and 9.872 hours with a brightness variation between 0.15 and 0.32 magnitude. An alternative period solution of 12.255 hours with an amplitude of 0.33 magnitude was found by Brian Warner in March 2006.

Diameter and albedo 

According to the surveys carried out by the Infrared Astronomical Satellite IRAS, the Japanese Akari satellite and the NEOWISE mission of NASA's Wide-field Infrared Survey Explorer, Kniertje measures between 21.52 and 29.592 kilometers in diameter and its surface has an albedo between 0.0351 and 0.3077.

The Collaborative Asteroid Lightcurve Link derives an albedo of 0.0701 and a diameter of 26.59 kilometers based on an absolute magnitude of 11.38.

Naming 

This minor planet was named after the principal character in Op Hoop van Zegen, a play by Dutch writer Herman Heijermans (1864–1924). The official naming citation was mentioned in The Names of the Minor Planets by Paul Herget in 1955.

Notes

References

External links 
 Asteroid Lightcurve Database (LCDB), query form (info )
 Dictionary of Minor Planet Names, Google books
 Asteroids and comets rotation curves, CdR – Observatoire de Genève, Raoul Behrend
 Discovery Circumstances: Numbered Minor Planets (1)-(5000) – Minor Planet Center
 
 

001384
Discoveries by Hendrik van Gent
Named minor planets
19340909